The Turnip Winter (German: Steckrübenwinter) of 1916 to 1917 was a period of profound civilian hardship in Germany during World War I.

Introduction 

For the duration of World War I, Germany was constantly under threat of starvation due to the success of the Allied blockade of Germany. Whatever meagre rations remained were sent to the troops fighting the war, so the civilian population faced the brunt of the famine. The winter of 1916–1917, later known as the "Turnip Winter", marked one of the harshest years in wartime Germany. Poor autumn weather led to an equally poor potato harvest and much of the produce that was shipped to German cities rotted. Germany's massive military recruitment played a direct role in this, as all areas of the economy suffered from lack of manpower, including agriculture. The loss of the potato crop forced the German population to subsist on Swedish turnip or rutabaga as an alternative.

Traditionally used as animal feed, the root vegetable was virtually the only food available throughout the winter of 1917. Malnourishment and illness claimed thousands of lives, mainly those of civilians, and wounded soldiers who had returned to the home front. A distinct example of the conditions at home in Germany was the spike in female mortality, which when compared to pre-war rates, increased by 11.5% in 1916 and 30% in 1917. This rate increased due to malnutrition and disease that was commonplace amongst the German populace. The famine and hardship of the Turnip Winter severely affected the morale within Germany, revealing to the Germans just how hard-pressed the nation-state had become under the duress of the war.

Background

At war with France, Britain, and Russia beginning in the summer of 1914, Germany faced the strain of a two-front war. To evade this compromising situation the Germans developed a strategy known as the Schlieffen Plan. The Plan proposed that if German troops could invade France through Belgium and defeat the French, quickly removing one front, they would then be able to focus solely on Russia.  German faith in the Schlieffen Plan proved overly optimistic and French forces commanded by General Joseph Joffre “checked the German attack at the Marne River in September,” in what would be known as the First Battle of the Marne.   After facing defeat at the Battle of the Marne, the actual strain of a two-front war became progressively more real for Germany. The Germans had assumed that the Schlieffen Plan would prove successful and that the war would not be a prolonged affair.  In the months after the Battle of the Marne, German troops faced a succession of battles against combined British and French armies, known as the “Race to the Sea,” where the opposing forces attempted to “turn the other’s flank" in a contest to reach the North Sea.  From October to late November, the armies clashed in a nearly month-long battle at Ypres in Flanders, near the North Sea, which incurred a devastating loss of life for both sides.  After Ypres, only months after the beginning of the Great War, the German army had already lost 241,000 men.  As the end of 1914 approached, fighting in Western Europe, ultimately known as the “Western Front,” settled to a draining affair as the German, French and British lines entrenched themselves.  In response to the early land campaigns, the British responded with naval measures. In order to wear down German forces, the British navy towards the end of 1914 blockaded “the northern approaches to the North Sea in an effort to cut off supplies to the soldiers and civilians of the Central Powers.”  Locked into sustained fighting on the Western Front, which had already reduced supplies, the Germans now faced both the Russian threat in the east and the British blockade that “cut Germany off from sources of essential commodities.”  The British blockade highlighted major flaws in German wartime society. Although German economy was an international juggernaut that “managed to produce most of the industrial requirements of the war,” the nation “failed to secure a sufficiency of food.”  With continued fighting on two fronts and supplies restricted by the British blockade, German food shortages at home and for troops became increasingly troublesome issues. During the winter of 1916–17, such problems reached new levels in a period known as the "Turnip Winter'".

The Turnip Winter

The Turnip Winter occurred during the winter of 1916–1917 in Germany. Continually poor weather conditions led to a diminished harvest, most notably in cereal production. Additionally, an Allied blockade first instituted in 1914 contributed to reduced food supplies from Central Powers by 33 percent. Food shortages were also attributed to a seizure of horses for the army, the conscription of a large part of the agricultural workforce, and a shortage of farming fertilizers caused by the diversion of nitrogen to explosives production.

In response, the German government initiated a food rationing campaign. The campaign began with the establishment of the War Food Office on May 22, 1916. The office was responsible for “the perception of the Chancellor to create and uphold the military and nation's food supply.”  In the summer of 1917, the food allocated only offered  daily diet and dropped to 1,000 calories per day in winter. However, the Imperial Health Office (renamed "Reich Health Office" in 1918) required  for a healthy adult male, three times what was available in winter. The Health Office also set maximum prices to ensure the nutrition of Germany's poor. Current historians attest that national figures regarding the event are misleading, stating farmers and soldiers ate better than common folk. The government also worked to combat cereal shortages by making bread baked with potato. At the rise of a potato famine in 1916, a German culinary staple, the government substituted the item with turnips hoping to make up the difference.  In turn, German soldiers, "increasingly relied, for sheer survival, on one of the least appealing vegetables known to man, the humble turnip." During this time, the black market became a prominent means of obtaining otherwise scarce foodstuffs. Historian Avner Offer suggests that approximately “one-fifth to one-third of food could only be obtained through illegal channels.”

Social unrest
Driven by starvation, children would break into barns and loot orchards in search of food. Such disregard for authority effectively doubled the youth crime rate in Germany. Historian G.J. Meyer noted that, according to a report from a prominent Berlin physician, “eighty thousand children had died of starvation in 1916.”  Worker strikes were also common during this time as food shortages often directly led to labor unrest. The most notable strike took place in Düsseldorf in the summer of 1917 where workers complained of uneven food distribution.

Military issues
In 1916, a naval revolt arose from protests against inedible rations. Sailors claimed that they received rations, shorted by two ounces, for three consecutive weeks while officers ate and drank luxuriously. The conservative German government believed a Socialist conspiracy was behind the mutiny. In 1926, German officials put Socialist Deputy Dittmann on trial for the uprising. Through letters from sailors to their respective homes, Dittmann illustrated that food was inedible and “did not have any political significance.”  The letters cleared the Socialist party from accusations that they had sought to extend the Bolshevik Revolution into Germany.

Results and effects
In October 1918, consumption of protein decreased to less than 20 percent. The Allied blockade policy continued following the armistice in November 1918. Food shortages led to prolonged malnutrition and subsequent civilian deaths from starvation and deficiency diseases.  The addition of turnips to the diets of many Germans weakened their immune systems and contributed, in many cases, to illnesses such as influenza. During World War I, food shortages starved approximately 750,000 Germans to deaths.

Aftermath
The solution to replace potatoes with turnips greatly affected the diets and nutrition of the German people during and after the war. By the start of the war, Germany consumed potatoes more than any other food and the shortage greatly changed the gastronomic tastes of the Germans.  In addition to affecting the German’s tastes, replacing the potatoes did not allow the German people to get the necessary vitamins and minerals they were accustomed to acquiring.  The turnips did not just affect the potatoes, but the bread as well. Bread called Kriegsbrot ("War bread") contained flour from potatoes. When replaced by substitutes, the bread became significantly harder to digest, making it difficult for the body to adapt to this change. The Kriegsbrot demonstrates how the Turnip Winter reached the front lines as well, as soldiers were greatly affected by the lack of food. The continued search for substitutes during the blockade truly affected the ability for the German people to obtain food in cities. One woman recounts the experience by saying:

However, not only were there physical symptoms, as she describes, but also social consequences, such as the pillaging of food stores after the war.

Notes

References 

Neiberg, Michael S. Fighting The Great War. Cambridge: Harvard University Press, 2005.
Storey, William Kelleher. First World War: A Concise Global History. Rowman & Littlefield, 2010, 71.
Wright, Gordon. France in Modern Times. New York: W. W. Norton, 1981.

German Empire in World War I
1916 in Germany
1917 in Germany
Famines in Germany
20th-century famines
1916 disasters in Germany
1917 disasters in Germany